Naviband (stylysed as NAVIBAND, until late 2016 also called NAVI) is a Belarusian band from Minsk. The band was founded a duo between vocalist and guitarist Arciom Lukjanienka and vocalist and keyboardist Ksienija Žuk, later also featured guitarist Aliaksandr Taboĺski, bassist Uladzislaŭ Čaščavik, and drummer Uladzimir Biehier.

The band rose to fame with a primarily Belarusian-language repertoire, but have also performed several songs in Russian and released a single in Ukrainian. Their first song "Abdymi myane" became a hit in their native Belarus. This was followed by their debut album Lovi, released in 2014. Afterwards, the band did multiple attempts to represent Belarus at the Eurovision Song Contest. Eventually, Naviband represented Belarus in the Eurovision Song Contest 2017 with the song "Historyja majho žyccia" finishing in 17th place, their country's fourth-best result.

History

2013-2014: "Abdymi myane", first albums and first Eurovision attempts
Naviband was formed as duo in 2013 in Minsk by journalism student Arciom Lukjanienka and music student Ksienija Žuk. Their first project was the song "Abdymi myane", which was released in the summer of 2013. The song immediately became a radio hit in Belarus leading to the beginning of the duo's career. Lukjanienka and Žuk married on 5 September 2014. The duo did its first attempt to represent Belarus at the Eurovision Song Contest with its first and only song in English until 2021, but did not advance the audition rounds. 

In early 2014, Naviband released their first album Lovi, containing songs in Russian and Belarusian. Their first album and songs received positive responses from Russian, and Ukrainian popular musicians, including Diana Arbenina and Sergei Babkin.

The releases slightly increased their popularity and the group held their first concerts in Minsk, Hrodna and Homiel and performed at a Christmas concert at the Bolshoi Theater in Moscow.

The duet auditioned for the Belarusian selection for Eurovision 2015 in December 2014. They presented the Belarusian-language song "Vyberu sam", but did not advance to the final of the selection. A few weeks later, the group released their second album, Soncam sahretyja, with songs solely in Belarusian.

2015-2016: Becoming a band, "Heta zyamlya" and rise to popularity in Belarus 

In January 2015, Naviband won the Belarusian music prize Lira for "Best Song in Belarusian Language" for their single "Abdymi myane".. Not much later, Arciom Lukjanienka and Ksienija Žuk were joined by Aliaksandr Taboĺski (production, electric guitar), Uladzislaŭ Čaščavik (bass), and Uladzimir Biehier (drums) and started to transform the duet into a band.  The group subsequently performed "Fa-fa-fa" and "Abdymi myane" on the CTV programme At the same place at the same time. 

In recognition of their rising popularity, Naviband were invited as a participant at one of the concert at the Slavianski Bazaar in Vitebsk. In addition to solo performances in Belarusian cities, the group also held solo concerts in Prague, Warsaw, Moscow and St. Petersburg and performed at the Wild Mint Festival and Bardauskaja Vosień. In September 2015, the group won the competitive part of the Basowiszcza festival of Belarusian rock music.

In November 2015, Naviband released the single "Heta Ziamlya" (This land), which went to the finals of the national selection for the Eurovision Song Contest-2016. In February 2016, Naviband was announced as a participant in the Belarusian selection with the song "Heta Ziamlya". They eventually placed fourth in the national final.

February 14, 2016 sold-out solo concert in Minsk club Re:Public. A recording of that concert was released as a live album later that year. In June, they met English singer and actress Joss Stone in Minsk, singing "Abdymi myane".  In July 2016, Naviband performed "Nash motiv" as a duet during the Slavianski Bazaar concert Vitebsk gathers friends. 

At the end of 2016, Naviband again declared their desire to represent Belarus at the Eurovision Song Contest-2017.

2017-2018: Eurovision Song Contest 2017, Iliuminacyja and Adnoj darohaj 
On 20 January 2017, Naviband again took part in the Belarusian Eurovision selection with the song "Historyja Majho žyccia" (The Story of My Life). The same day the third album of the band was released, it was called Iliuminacyja.

In the final of the national selection, Naviband took first place and were given the right to represent Belarus at the Eurovision Song Contest 2017 in May 2017 in Kyiv, becoming the first participant in the history of the contest who performed the song in the Belarusian language.

In February 2017, their Eurovision song was chosen as "Best Belarusian Song" at the second Lira Awards. Meanwhile, the group performed at Vidbir, the Ukrainian national selection for Eurovision. Their surprise Belarusian cover of Jamala's 1944 created a large public resonance in Ukraine and the group was told by Konstantin Meladze that Ukraine would probably give Belarus the maximum result.

After the draw, it became known that Naviband will perform in the second semifinal on 11 May. Based on the results of the voting on May 11, the group reached the final of the competition, where it performed third in the running order. In the final, Naviband scored 83 points, receiving a maximum of 24 points from Ukraine, finishing in 17th place. Naviband's performance aroused great resonance and extremely positive public reaction in Belarus as the group managed to achieve the country's fourth-best result and the second-best points-wise in Belarusian history.

On 3 June 2017, about ten thousand people came to the Naviband performance near the Minsk City Hall. A live performance on July 3, near Stella's "Minsk - Hero City", was broadcast by All-National TV.

On 4 December 2017, they released the song "A dzie žyvieš ty?". In the song's music video, they announced that Arciom and Ksienija were expecting a child together. Four days later, Naviband released their fourth album Adnoj Darohaj. From the first day it took the first line of the charts of Belarusian iTunes and Google Play Music. All the songs on the album are written in Belarusian language.

On February 16, 2018, they performed "Historyja Majho žyccia" and "A dzie žyvieš ty?" at the Belarusian selection for the Eurovision Song Contest 2018.
On March 1, 2018, Ksienija announced on her Instagram that they are expecting a son. Their son Matsei was born on 1 May 2018.

In late 2018, the band performed their first Ukrainian-language track, "Sumne more".

2019-present: NaviBand and social activism
NAVIBAND recorded their eponymous fifth album in Kyiv, Ukraine with the help of crowdfunding. NaviBand was released on 5 December 2019. From the album, two singles were released: "Galileo (Dva cheloveka)" and "Odin iz nas". 

In June 2020, the group released "Inshymi". During the 2020 Belarusian protests, the song was frequently used and was named by Meduza.io as one of the songs that described the protests. The band also performed the song on the streets during one of the protests. Subsequently, the group released "Devochka v belom" in September 2020, which was dedicated to female protesters. The group continued their social activism with the song "Milliony bol'shikh serdets", which was also dedicated to the protest.  

The group spoke out their support to remove Belarus from the Eurovision Song Contest 2021, which eventually happened in March 2021. In the follow-up of the protests, Naviband claimed that their songs were not allowed to be played anymore at student singing competitions.

Members
 Arciom Lukjanienka – vocals, guitar – born  in Hlybokaye, Vitebsk Region. He is an adherent of the Catholic Church.
 Ksienija Žuk – vocals, keyboard – born  in Minsk.
 Aliaksandr Taboĺski – production, electric guitar. During one of the protest of the 2020-2021 Belarusian protests, Taboĺski was arrested and spent one night in prison.
 Uladzislaŭ Čaščavik – bass
 Uladzimir Biehier – drums

Discography

Studio albums

Live albums

Singles

Television

References

External links

Belarusian musical groups
Belarusian pop music groups
Musical groups established in 2013
2013 establishments in Belarus
Eurovision Song Contest entrants for Belarus
Eurovision Song Contest entrants of 2017
Belarusian-language singers